Jamaica competed at the 2018 Commonwealth Games in the Gold Coast, Australia from 4 to 15 April 2018. It was Jamaica's 17th appearance at the Commonwealth Games.

Swimmer Alia Atkinson was the country's flag bearer during the opening ceremony.

Medalists

Competitors
The following is the list of number of competitors participating at the Games per sport/discipline.

Athletics

Jamaica participated with 51 athletes (30 men and 21 women).

Men
Track & road events

* Competed in heats only.

Field events

Women
Track & road events

Field events

Badminton

Jamaica participated with five athletes (three men and two women)

Singles

Doubles

Mixed team

Roster
Alana Bailey
Dennis Coke
Anthony McNee
Samuel Ricketts
Katherine Wynter

Pool B

Basketball

Jamaica qualified a women's basketball team of 12 athletes. The team was invited by FIBA and the CGF.

Women's tournament

Roster

Pool B

Qualifying finals

Boxing

Jamaica participated with a team of 1 athlete (1 man)

Men

Cycling

Jamaica participated with 1 athlete (1 man).

Road

Track

Points race

Scratch race

Diving

Jamaica participated with a team of 1 athlete (1 man).

Men

Gymnastics

Artistic
Jamaica participated with 1 athlete (1 man).

Men
Individual Qualification

Individual Finals

Lawn bowls

Jamaica will compete in Lawn bowls.

Men

Netball

Jamaica qualified a netball team by virtue of being ranked in the top 11 (excluding the host nation, Australia) of the INF World Rankings on 1 July 2017.

Roster

Romelda Aiken
Nicole Dixon
Shanice Beckford
Stacian Facey
Jhaniele Fowler-Reid
Rebekah Robinson
Shamera Sterling
Adean Thomas
Paula Thompson
Khadijah Williams
Vangelee Williams
Jodi-Ann Ward

Pool A

Semi-finals

Bronze medal match

Rugby sevens

Men's tournament

Jamaica qualified a men's rugby sevens team of 12 athletes, by winning the 2017 RAN Sevens. This will mark the country's Commonwealth Games debut in the sport.

Roster

Rhodri Adamson
Nyle Beckett
Anthony Bingham
Tyler Bush
Mikel Facey
Owen Linton
Conan Osborne
Reinhardo Richards
Lucas Roy-Smith
Ashley Smith
Gareth Stoppani
Marcus Webber

Pool B

Shooting

Jamaica participated with 2 athletes (2 men).

Open

Squash

Jamaica participated with 2 athletes (2 men).

Individual

Doubles

Swimming

Jamaica participated with 1 athlete (1 woman).

Women

Table tennis

Jamaica participated with 2 athletes (2 men).

Singles

Doubles

Triathlon

Jamaica participated with 2 athletes (1 man and 1 woman).

Individual

Wrestling

Jamaica participated with 1 athlete (1 man).

Men

See also
Jamaica at the 2018 Summer Youth Olympics

References

Nations at the 2018 Commonwealth Games
Jamaica at the Commonwealth Games
2018 in Jamaican sport